The 2018 Abu Dhabi Tour was a road cycling stage race that took place between 21 and 25 February 2018 in Abu Dhabi. It was the fourth edition of the Abu Dhabi Tour and the third event of the 2018 UCI World Tour.

The race was won on the final day by the 's Alejandro Valverde, from Spain, winning the stage finish up to Jebel Hafeet. The performance by López was also enough for him to win the young rider classification.

In the race's other classifications, Italy's Elia Viviani – riding for  – was the winner of the green jersey for the points classification, winning the second stage during the race, while 's Nikolay Trusov from Russia won the intermediate sprints classification and its accompanying black jersey, having led the standings from start to finish.

Teams
As the race was only added to the UCI World Tour calendar in 2017, all UCI WorldTeams were invited to the race, but not obligated to compete in the race. As such, seventeen of the eighteen WorldTeams – with the exception of  – competed in the race, up one on 2017. Three UCI Professional Continental teams competed as well, completing the 20-team peloton.

Route
The route for the 2018 edition of the race was released on 23 January 2018. The race was extended from four stages to five, with the addition of an individual time trial for the first time; as well as this, the summit finish of Jebel Hafeet ends the race instead of a circuit race at the Yas Marina motor racing circuit.

Stages

Stage 1
21 February 2018 — Madinat Zayed to Madinat Zayed,

Stage 2
22 February 2018 — Yas Mall to Yas Beach,

Stage 3
23 February 2018 — Nation Towers to Big Flag, Al Marina,

Stage 4
24 February 2018 — Al Maryah Island to Al Maryah Island, individual time trial (ITT)

Stage 5
25 February 2018 — Qasr Al Muwaiji to Jebel Hafeet,

Classification leadership table
In the 2018 Abu Dhabi Tour, four different jerseys were awarded. For the general classification, calculated by adding each cyclist's finishing times on each stage, and allowing time bonuses for the first three finishers at intermediate sprints and at the finish of mass-start stages, the leader received a red jersey. This classification was considered the most important of the 2018 Abu Dhabi Tour, and the winner of the classification was considered the winner of the race.

Additionally, there was a points classification, which awarded a green jersey. In the points classification, cyclists received points for finishing in the top 10 in a stage. For winning a stage, a rider earned 20 points, with 16 for second, 12 for third, 9 for fourth, 7 for fifth, 5 for sixth with a point fewer per place down to a single point for 10th place. Points towards the classification could also be accrued – on an 8–5–3–1 basis – at intermediate sprint points during each stage, with the exception of the individual time trial; these intermediate sprints also offered bonus seconds towards the general classification. There was also a sprints classification for the points awarded at the aforementioned intermediate sprints, where the leadership of which was marked by a black jersey.

The fourth jersey represented the young rider classification, marked by a white jersey. This was decided in the same way as the general classification, but only riders born after 1 January 1993 were eligible to be ranked in the classification. There was also a classification for teams, in which the times of the best three cyclists per team on each stage were added together; the leading team at the end of the race was the team with the lowest total time.

References

External links

2018
2018 UCI World Tour
2018 in Emirati sport
February 2018 sports events in Asia